The Valley Springs School is a historic school building at 1 School Street in Valley Springs, Arkansas.  Now part of a larger school complex, it is a single-story fieldstone structure with a wide south-facing facade, and a gable-on-hip roof.  There are two entrance pavilions, marked by steeply-pitched gable projections.  The left entrance is deeply recessed under a rounded archway, while that on the right, although also recessed, has a flat-roofed pavilion sheltering access to it.  Fenestration is provided by groups of sash windows arranged symmetrically across the facade.  The school was built in 1940 with funding from the Works Progress Administration, and originally served as the community's high school.

The building was listed on the National Register of Historic Places in 1992.

See also
National Register of Historic Places listings in Boone County, Arkansas

References

School buildings on the National Register of Historic Places in Arkansas
National Register of Historic Places in Boone County, Arkansas
1940 establishments in Arkansas
School buildings completed in 1940
Bungalow architecture in Arkansas
American Craftsman architecture in Arkansas
Schools in Boone County, Arkansas
Works Progress Administration in Arkansas